Maiwa's Revenge, or The War of the Little Hand is a short novel by English writer H. Rider Haggard about the hunter Allan Quatermain. The story involves Quatermain going on a hunting expedition, then taking part in an attack on a native kraal to rescue a captured English hunter and avenge Maiwa, an African princess whose baby has been killed.

References

External links
Maiwa's Revenge at Project Gutenberg
 
Images and bibliographic information for various editions of Maiwa's Revenge at SouthAfricaBooks.com

Novels by H. Rider Haggard
1888 British novels
British adventure novels
British historical novels
Novels set in colonial Africa
Fiction set in 1859